Wambalana is a monospecific genus of ovoviviparous velvet worms containing the single species Wambalana makrothele. This species has 15 pairs of legs in both sexes. The type locality of this species is Telegherry State Forest, New South Wales, Australia.

References

Further reading
 

Onychophorans of Australasia
Onychophoran genera
Monotypic protostome genera
Fauna of New South Wales
Endemic fauna of Australia
Taxa named by Amanda Reid (malacologist)